Edgar Lobel (24 December 1888 – 7 July 1982) was a Romanian-British classicist and papyrologist who is best known for his four decades overseeing the publication of the literary texts among the Oxyrhynchus Papyri and for his edition of Sappho and Alcaeus in collaboration with Denys Page. His contributions to the fields of papyrology and Greek studies were many and substantial, and Eric Gardner Turner believed that Lobel should "be acknowledged as a scholar to be mentioned in the same breath as Porson and Bentley, a towering genius of English scholarship."

Early life and education
Lobel was born in Iași, Romania on 24 December 1888. As a youth he moved to Higher Broughton with his parents Amelia and Arthur Lobel, a shipowner. He was educated at Kersal School before moving on to Manchester Grammar School where he was head boy and won a scholarship to Balliol College, Oxford in 1906. Despite the fact that his father had been compelled by poverty to emigrate to the United States, Lobel took up his scholarship in 1907 and studied under several noted classicists, including the Lucretius scholar Cyril Bailey and A.W. Pickard-Cambridge In 1911 he graduated having taken first class in Mods and Greats, in addition to winning the Gaisford Prize for Greek Verse and several other University honours. After a year's work as a professor's assistant, he continued his studies at Oxford, where he made close acquaintances of Gilbert Murray and his wife. But perhaps the most important friendship that he struck during this period was with the papyrologist A.S. Hunt, who introduced Lobel to the study of papyrology and induced him to travel to Berlin to study under Wilhelm Schubart in 1913 and 1914.

Academic career and later life

Before papyri, Lobel’s elective field of research was Greek palaeography. In 1933, he published a book on the manuscripts of Aristotle’s Poetics.

His edition of Sappho and Alcaeus, Poetarum Lesbiorum Fragmenta (co-edited with Denys Page), appeared in 1955, and in the same year Lobel declined to be knighted.

Lobel is best known for having been the general editor of the Oxyrhynchus Papyri from 1941 to 1972; as such he supervised the editing and publishing of twenty-two volumes of the series, from. vol. XVIII to XXIX, which contain more than 700 papyri and gave significant contributions to classical philology and knowledge of Ancient Greek literature—most notably Callimachus, Sappho and Alcaeus.

Lobel was never attracted by teaching: when his College (Queen's) obliged him to held a Class, he put his lesson on Saturday afternoon. Also, he apparently didn't like papyri per se—instead, he is reported to have said "the poets I like happen to have been transmitted in this way". He also met Ulrich von Wilamowitz-Moellendorff, the most influent German classical scholar of the 20th cen., but didn't like him, nor he did like Wilamowitz's favourite author, Euripides: "Euripides, like Wilamowitz, knew no Greek!".

Publications

The Oxryhynchus Papyri

 The Oxyrhynchus Papyri, vol. XVIII [2157-2207] (London, 1941)
 The Oxyrhynchus Papyri, vol. XIX [2208-2244] (London, 1948)
 The Oxyrhynchus Papyri, vol. XX [2245-2287] (London, 1952)
 The Oxyrhynchus Papyri, vol. XXI [2288-2308] (London, 1951)
 The Oxyrhynchus Papyri, vol. XXII [2309-2353] (London, 1954)
 The Oxyrhynchus Papyri, vol. XXIII [2354-2382] (London, 1956)
 The Oxyrhynchus Papyri, vol. XXIV [2383-2425] (London, 1957)
 The Oxyrhynchus Papyri, vol. XXV [2426-2437] (London, 1959)
 The Oxyrhynchus Papyri, vol. XXVI [2438-2451] (London, 1961)
 The Oxyrhynchus Papyri, vol. XXVII [2452-2480] (London, 1962)
 The Oxyrhynchus Papyri, vol. XXVIII [2481-2505] (London, 1962)
 The Oxyrhynchus Papyri, vol. XXIX [2506] (London, 1963)
 The Oxyrhynchus Papyri, vol. XXX [2507-2530] (London, 1964)
 The Oxyrhynchus Papyri, vol. XXXI [2531-2616] (London, 1966)
 The Oxyrhynchus Papyri, vol. XXXII [2617-2653] (London, 1967)
 The Oxyrhynchus Papyri, vol. XXXIII [2654-2682] (London, 1968)
 The Oxyrhynchus Papyri, vol. XXXIV [2683-2732] (London, 1968)
 The Oxyrhynchus Papyri, vol. XXXV [2733-2744] (London, 1968)
 The Oxyrhynchus Papyri, vol. XXXVI [2745-2800] (London, 1970)
 The Oxyrhynchus Papyri, vol. XXXVII [2801-2823] (London, 1971)
 The Oxyrhynchus Papyri, vol. XXXVIII [2824-2877] (London, 1971)
 The Oxyrhynchus Papyri, vol. XXXIX [2878-2891] (London, 1972)

Some of these volumes were edited by other scholars (like vol. XXIX, by Sir Denys Page), but Lobel was the general editor of the series. While Vols. XXVIII-XX made significant contributions to our knowledge of Callimachus' works, Lobel, unlike Grenfell and Hunt, ignored non-literary papyri, which make up the majority of material.

Critical editions
 : The Fragments of the Lyrical Poems of Sappho (Oxford, 1925)
 : The Fragments of the Lyrical Poems of Alcaeus (Oxford, 1927)
 (with D. Page) Poetarum Lesbiorum fragmenta (Oxford, 1955)

Poetarum Lesbiorum fragmenta (commonly referred in editions as Lobel-Page or L.-P.) is still one of the two standard editions of Sappho and Alcaeus, the other being E.-M. Voigt (ed.), Sappho et Alcaeus. Fragmenta (Amsterdam 1971). Lobel and Page’s edition, alongside with Voigt’s, set the standard text for Sappho and Alcaeus’ fragments and no other critical edition of the Lesbian poets had been published until 2021, when Camillo Neri completed his edition of Sappho (critical text with Italian translation and extensive commentary; includes recently—2004, 2014—discovered fragments unknown to both Lobel-Page and Voigt).

Also, Lobel, like Paul Maas, helped Rudolf Pfeiffer with his edition of Callimachus' works and fragments (2 vols., Oxford 1949–1953).

Select occasional publications
 Greek Manuscripts of Aristotle's Poetics (London, 1933)

Notes

Bibliography
 .
 .
 .
 
 .
 .

External links
 Edgar Lobel at the Oxyrhynchus Papyri Project website

1888 births
1982 deaths
People from Broughton, Greater Manchester
British papyrologists
English classical scholars
Alumni of Balliol College, Oxford
People educated at Manchester Grammar School
Romanian emigrants to the United Kingdom